The Hole is the eighteenth studio album by the Dutch hard rock band Golden Earring, released in 1986. The band gave a free promotion concert in support of the album on the beach of Scheveningen for an audience of 185,000. Anton Corbijn made a video clip for the single "Quiet Eyes". It was made in the same black and white style as the photographs he made for the inner sleeve of the album.

Track listing
All songs written by Barry Hay and George Kooymans except where noted.
Side one
"They Dance" - 5:10
"Quiet Eyes" - 4:03
"Save the Best for Later" - 5:14
"Have a Heart" - 3:59
"Love in Motion" - 3:44
Side two
"Jane Jane" - 4:54
"Jump and Run" (George Kooymans) - 5:52
"Why Do I" - 4:44
"A Shout in the Dark" - 5:33

Personnel
George Kooymans - guitar, vocals
Rinus Gerritsen - bass guitar, keyboards
Barry Hay - vocals
Cesar Zuiderwijk - drums

Additional personnel
Robert Jan Stips - keyboards
Lisa Boray - backing vocals
Loa Boray - backing vocals
Wim Both - trumpet
Dionys Breukers - keyboards
Piet Dolder - trombone
Peter Kuyt - trumpet
Julya Lo'Ko - backing vocals
Patty Paff - backing vocals
Rudi Van Dijk - saxophone

Production
Producer: Shell Schellekens
Engineer: Kees Van Gool
Mixing: Robin Freeman, Jan Schuurman
Mastering: Greg Calbi
Horn arrangements: Rudi Van Dijk
Art direction: Anton Corbijn
Photography: Anton Corbijn

Charts

Album

Singles

Quiet Eyes

Golden Earring albums
1986 albums